Sebastián Vázquez  may refer to:

 Sebastián Vázquez (basketball) (born 1985), Uruguayan basketball player
 Sebastián Vázquez (football) (born 1980), Uruguayan football player
 Sebastián Vázquez (golfer) (born 1990), Mexican golfer